Gug Tappeh-ye Khaleseh (also Romanized as Gūg Tappeh-ye Khāleşeh; also known as Gog Tappeh) is a village in, and the capital of, Marhemetabad Rural District of the Central District of Miandoab County, West Azerbaijan province, Iran. At the 2006 National Census, its population was 2,813 in 672 households. The following census in 2011 counted 2,794 people in 774 households. The latest census in 2016 showed a population of 2,548 people in 790 households; it was the largest village in its rural district.

References 

Miandoab County

Populated places in West Azerbaijan Province

Populated places in Miandoab County